Lutman may refer to:

Carlos Camacho Lutman (born 1994), Mexican soccer player
Lutman, Missouri, an extinct town